This is a list of amphibians found in Haiti. There are 58 amphibian species recorded in Haiti.

See also
 List of amphibians of Hispaniola

References 

 
Amphibians
Haiti
Haiti